The following is a partial list of the "G" codes for Medical Subject Headings (MeSH), as defined by the United States National Library of Medicine (NLM).

This list continues the information at List of MeSH codes (G08). Codes following these are found at List of MeSH codes (G10). For other MeSH codes, see List of MeSH codes.

The source for this content is the set of 2006 MeSH Trees from the NLM.

– circulatory and respiratory physiology

– blood physiology

– blood physiologic phenomena
  – acid-base equilibrium
  – bleeding time
  – blood bactericidal activity
  – blood cell count
  – erythrocyte count
  – reticulocyte count
  – leukocyte count
  – lymphocyte count
  – cd4 lymphocyte count
  – cd4-cd8 ratio
  – platelet count
  – blood viscosity
  – blood volume
  – erythrocyte volume
  – plasma volume
  – erythrocyte deformability
  – erythrocyte indices
  – hematocrit
  – osmotic fragility
  – partial thromboplastin time
  – platelet adhesiveness
  – prothrombin time
  – reticulocytosis
  – thrombin time
  – whole blood coagulation time

– blood physiologic processes
  – blood bactericidal activity
  – erythrocyte aggregation
  – erythrocyte aging
  – hematopoiesis
  – erythropoiesis
  – hematopoiesis, extramedullary
  – leukopoiesis
  – lymphopoiesis
  – myelopoiesis
  – thrombopoiesis
  – hemostasis
  – blood coagulation
  – fibrinolysis
  – platelet activation
  – clot retraction
  – platelet adhesiveness
  – platelet aggregation
  – phagocytosis

– cardiovascular physiology

– cardiovascular physiologic phenomena
  – capillary fragility
  – capillary permeability
  – cardiovascular deconditioning
  – hemodynamic phenomena
  – blood flow velocity
  – blood pressure
  – pulmonary wedge pressure
  – venous pressure
  – central venous pressure
  – portal pressure
  – blood viscosity
  – blood volume
  – erythrocyte volume
  – plasma volume
  – cardiac output
  – stroke volume
  – cardiac volume
  – heart rate
  – heart rate, fetal
  – heart sounds
  – heart murmurs
  – pulse
  – valsalva maneuver
  – vascular capacitance
  – vascular resistance
  – capillary resistance
  – ventricular pressure
  – vascular patency

– cardiovascular physiologic processes
  – atrial function
  – atrial function, left
  – atrial function, right
  – blood circulation
  – cerebrovascular circulation
  – collateral circulation
  – coronary circulation
  – microcirculation
  – placental circulation
  – pulmonary circulation
  – regional blood flow
  – renal circulation
  – renal blood flow, effective
  – renal plasma flow
  – renal plasma flow, effective
  – splanchnic circulation
  – liver circulation
  – hemodynamic processes
  – baroreflex
  – kallikrein-kinin system
  – renin–angiotensin system
  – vasoconstriction
  – vasodilation
  – myocardial contraction
  – diastole
  – systole
  – neovascularization, physiologic
  – ventricular function
  – ventricular function, left
  – ventricular function, right
  – ventricular pressure
  – ventricular remodeling

– respiratory physiology

– respiratory physiologic phenomena
  – airway resistance
  – lung compliance
  – pulmonary diffusing capacity
  – pulmonary ventilation
  – forced expiratory flow rates
  – maximal expiratory flow rate
  – maximal expiratory flow-volume curves
  – maximal midexpiratory flow rate
  – peak expiratory flow rate
  – forced expiratory volume
  – maximal voluntary ventilation
  – respiratory dead space
  – respiratory sounds
  – total lung capacity
  – closing volume
  – functional residual capacity
  – expiratory reserve volume
  – residual volume
  – vital capacity
  – expiratory reserve volume
  – inspiratory capacity
  – inspiratory reserve volume
  – tidal volume
  – valsalva maneuver
  – ventilation-perfusion ratio
  – voice
  – voice quality
  – work of breathing

– respiratory physiologic processes
  – mucociliary clearance
  – phonation
  – pulmonary circulation
  – respiration
  – respiratory mechanics
  – bronchoconstriction
  – exhalation
  – inhalation
  – respiratory transport
  – pulmonary gas exchange
  – sneezing
  – yawning

The list continues at List of MeSH codes (G10).

G09